Christiana Ruhrberg is a German-British cell biologist who is Professor of Neuronal and Vascular Biology, University College London. She looks to understand how cells interact during the development and disease of mammals.

Early life and education 
Ruhrberg was an undergraduate student at the Justus-Liebig-Universitaet, where she majored in biology. She was a Master's student at the University of Sussex where she investigated genetic changes that take place during ovarian cancer. Ruhrberg moved to Imperial College London to study genomic organisation in the human surfeit locus.

Ruhrberg was a doctoral researcher at the Imperial Cancer Research Fund, where she worked under the supervision of Fiona Watt. In 2006 the British Society for Cell Biology Young Cell Biologist of the Year. Ruhrberg was a postdoctoral researcher at the National Institute for Health Research where she worked under the supervision of Robb Krumlauf. Her postdoctoral research considered the development of cranial motor neurons. She returned to the Imperial Cancer Research Fund to work in the laboratory of David Shima, where she studied the molecular mechanisms that underpin the growth of blood vessels.

Research and career 
Ruhrberg moved to University College London in the early 2000s, and was promoted to Professor of Neuronal and Vascular Development at UCL in 2011.

Awards and honours 

 2003 Werner-Risau-Prize
 2003 Medical Research Council Career Development Award
 2017 British Society for Developmental Biology Cheryll Tickle Medal
 2018 North American Vascular Biology Organization Judah Folkman Award in Vascular Biology

Selected publications

References

Living people
Year of birth missing (living people)
21st-century German biologists
21st-century British biologists
Academics of University College London